Madison Bowey (born April 22, 1995) is a Canadian professional ice hockey defenceman for the Laval Rocket of the American Hockey League (AHL) while under contract to the Montreal Canadiens of the National Hockey League (NHL). He has formerly played for the Washington Capitals, Detroit Red Wings, Chicago Blackhawks and the Vancouver Canucks. Bowey was selected 53rd overall by the Capitals in the 2013 NHL Entry Draft. Bowey won the Stanley Cup as a member of the Capitals in 2018.

During the 2012–13 season he played with Team Canada to win gold medals at both the 2012 Ivan Hlinka Memorial Tournament and the 2013 IIHF World U18 Championships. Leading up to the 2013 NHL Entry Draft, Bowey was rated as a top prospect.

Playing career

Junior
Bowey was selected by the Kelowna Rockets in the second round, 23rd overall, in the 2010 WHL Bantam Draft. He appeared in 3 games at the end of Kelowna's 2010–11 WHL season recording one assist. The next year he emerged as a mainstay on the Rockets' blue-line, putting up 8 goals and 21 points in 57 games with a +3 rating and 39 PIM. He also scored a goal in 4 games in Kelowna's first round sweep at the hands of the Portland Winterhawks. Bowey also represented Team Canada West at the 2012 World U-17 Hockey Challenge, recording a goal in 5 games. During the 2012–13 WHL season Bowey emerged as one of Kelowna's most valuable defenders, scoring 12 goals and 30 points in 69 games with a +41 rating. His plus-minus rating that season was good for thirteenth amongst WHL players that season and he solidified his status as a major NHL prospect for the 2013 NHL Entry Draft. He helped lead the Rockets to a division title and a seven-game first round post-season victory over the Seattle Thunderbirds before being defeated by the arch rival Kamloops Blazers in the second round. Bowey recorded 4 assists in 11 total playoff games.

In the 2013–14 WHL season with Kelowna, Bowey scored 25 points in his first 25 games, demonstrating his development into a solid two-way defenceman.

Professional

Washington Capitals
On April 2, 2014, the Washington Capitals of the National Hockey League (NHL) signed Bowey to a three-year, entry-level contract to begin with the 2014–15 NHL season.

On October 14, 2017, Bowey was recalled from the Hershey Bears to replace Matt Niskanen who was placed on injured reserve. On October 26, 2017, he earned his first NHL point on an assist for Chandler Stephenson's first NHL goal in a 6–2 loss against the Vancouver Canucks. On June 7, 2018, Bowey won his first Stanley Cup with the Washington Capitals after defeating the Vegas Golden Knights in five games to capture the first Stanley Cup in the history of their franchise. Although Bowey did not play in the playoffs, he still met the regular season games played requirement to have his name engraved on the Stanley Cup.

In the following 2018–19 season, Bowey made the opening night roster for the first time in his career. On December 29, in a 3–2 win over the Ottawa Senators, both Bowey and fellow rookie defenseman Tyler Lewington recorded their first NHL goals, making the two players the first defensemen in Capitals history to score their first NHL goals in the same game. Bowey recorded six points in 33 games for the Capitals.

Detroit Red Wings
On February 22, 2019, the Capitals traded Bowey to the Detroit Red Wings, along with a second-round pick in the 2020 NHL Entry Draft, in exchange for Nick Jensen, and a fifth-round pick in the 2019 NHL Entry Draft.

He scored his first goal with the Red Wings on March 14 against the Tampa Bay Lightning.

Chicago Blackhawks
After going unsigned at the beginning of the 2020–21 season, Bowey initially signed a professional try-out (PTO) with the San Diego Gulls, the AHL affiliate of the Anaheim Ducks, on January 21, 2021. Bowey left the Gulls mid training camp after he was signed to a two-year, $1.45 million contract by the Chicago Blackhawks on January 28, 2021.

Vancouver Canucks
On April 12, 2021, during the 2021 NHL Trade Deadline, Bowey and a 2021 fifth-round pick were traded to the Vancouver Canucks in exchange for a 2021 fourth-round pick.

Montreal Canadiens
As a free agent from the Canucks, Bowey was signed to a one-year, two-way contract with the Montreal Canadiens on July 13, 2022.

International play

Bowey represented the Canada men's national under-18 ice hockey team at the 2012 Ivan Hlinka Memorial Tournament, helping contribute to a Gold Medal placing. At the 2013 IIHF World U18 Championships, Bowey scored the tying goal against the United States in the gold medal match before teammate Frédérik Gauthier scored the game-winner in a 3-2 victory over the heavily favoured American squad. He ended up scoring 2 goals and 4 points in 7 games with a +3 rating over the course of the tournament for the Canadians.

Career statistics

Regular season and playoffs

International

Awards and honours

See also
 Black players in ice hockey

References

External links
 
 Madison Bowey's career statistics at HockeysFuture.com

1995 births
Living people
Abbotsford Canucks players
Black Canadian ice hockey players
Canadian ice hockey defencemen
Chicago Blackhawks players
Detroit Red Wings players
Grand Rapids Griffins players
Hershey Bears players
Kelowna Rockets players
Laval Rocket players
Rockford IceHogs (AHL) players
Ice hockey people from Winnipeg
Stanley Cup champions
Vancouver Canucks players
Washington Capitals draft picks
Washington Capitals players